Ethmia dentata is a moth in the family Depressariidae. It is found in Japan, Taiwan, and the Philippines.

References

Moths described in 1966
dentata
Moths of Japan